, or A Storming Drummer, or The Stormy Man, is a 1957 color Japanese film directed by Umetsugu Inoue. The film is one of the most famous films for Yujiro Ishihara, who plays the main role of Kokubun Eiji, an unknown drummer.

Cast 
 Yujiro Ishihara : Kokubun Eiji
 Mie Kitahara : Fukushima Miyako
 Izumi Ashikawa : Shima Midori
 Nobuo Kaneko : Sakyo
 Tatsuya Fuji
 Kyoji Aoyama
 Kaku Takashina
 Mari Shiraki : Merry Oka
 Masumi Okada
 Jūkei Fujioka : Mochinaga
 Kaku Takashina : Ken

References

External links 
 

1957 films
Films directed by Umetsugu Inoue
Nikkatsu films
1950s Japanese films